China Movie Channel, the trade name of , an agency at the Chinese Government's State Administration of Press, Publication, Radio, Film and Television. In mainland China, the agency provides programming to the China Central Television channel CCTV-6, which is dedicated to movies. It airs CCTV New Year's Gala since February 18, 1996.

Programs
World Film Report (世界电影之旅)
 China Film Report (中国电影报道)
The Best (Jia Pian You Yue)(佳片有约)
 Movie Weekly (光影周刊)
 Golden Times (流金岁月)
 Love Movie Series ("爱-电影"系列)

Type of films played 
 故事片, Narrative Film
 译制片, Translated Film
 专题片, Special Film

Film collaborations 
Transformers: Age of Extinction (2014) (with Paramount Pictures, Platinum Dunes, and di Bonaventura Pictures)
Mission: Impossible – Rogue Nation (2015) (with Bad Robot Productions, Skydance Productions, TC Productions, and Alibaba Pictures)
Teenage Mutant Ninja Turtles: Out of the Shadows (2016) (with Nickelodeon Movies, Platinum Dunes, and Alibaba Pictures)

Oversea programming
These channels bear the China Movie Channel name, but they differ from the mainland equivalent in scheduling.
 China Movie Channel (Hong Kong)
 China Movie Channel (North America)
 China Movie Channel International

1905.com
1905.com is the official website and online streaming service of China Movie Channel. It is named after the year 1905, when Dingjun Mountain (the first Chinese language film) was released. It was originally hosted on the m1905.com domain, but it later moved to the current one. The website is operated by 1905 (Beijing) Network Technology Co., Ltd.

See also
 China Movie Channel Media Awards

References

External links
 Introduction page at the State Administration of Press, Publication, Radio, Film and Television
 
 Official Site 

China Central Television channels
Government agencies of China
Cinema of China
Television channels and stations established in 1996